Li Yi Bar (popular name Di Bar, also DB, D8, etc.) is a subforum of the Baidu Tieba forum. This subforum was opened for ridiculing Li Yi. This subforum is well known for a large number of followers, who often flood other Internet forums or subforums.

History 
Li Yi Bar was open in the year 2004, originally for ridiculing the soccer player Li Yi. He has a nickname Imperator Li Yi the Great, or "Da Di" for short, so the Li Yi Bar is nicknamed "Di Bar"(), "D8", etc., and it is also nicknamed "the Louvre of Baidu".
Because this subforum has a large number of followers and its followers often flood forums, it gets the title "whenever Di Bar sends expeditionary force, not even a blade of grass can be alive".

June 21 flood event 
In the year 2007, the subforum Li Yuchun Bar was in conflict with the subforum Li Yi Bar, which caused the owner of Li Yi Bar was blocked. Then, the followers of Li Yi Bar organized a message flood on Li Yuchun Bar. At about 18:20 on 21 June 2007, Li Yi Bar started flooding, and the owner of Li Yuchun Bar deleted those spams continuously. At about 20:20, the flood was as fast as 30 posts per second, so the deletion was not fast enough to remove the spams. Consequently, Li Yuchun Bar was finally conquered.

July 29 flood event 
On 28 July 2013 to 29 July 2013, there was a large flood on Baidu Tieba. On 28 July 2013, a Tencent Weibo user named Pan Mengying insulted some famous soccer players such as Cristiano Ronaldo, Lionel Messi, etc., and showed no respect on soccer, which angered many Chinese fans of Real Madrid CF and FC Barcelona, which escalates their conflicts and therefore those angry fans decided to flood the over 20 subforums of the Baidu Tieba forum at 8:00 PM. Because the larger and larger population joined this flood event, it inflamed the anger at Chinese fans of Korean stars, and resulted in the participation of the followers of Li Yi Bar and WOW Bar. On the evening of 28 July 2013, the flood went to the climax. Billions of spams were posted in dozens of subforums of Baidu Tieba.

2016 Chinese meme war on Facebook 
In January 2016, a Sina Weibo user organized a flood team from Li Yi Bar, whose mission was to flood Tsai Ing-wen's Facebook pages under the theme of anti-Taiwan independence. At 19:00 on 20 January 2016, the flood started. The Facebook pages of Tsai Ing-wen, Apple Daily, SET News were seriously flooded and therefore they had to ban comments in order to stop the message flood attack. During this event, the Facebook pages were flooded by billions of meme pictures and stickers, and therefore it was called meme war on Facebook.

2018 flood on the Facebook pages of the Ministry for Foreign Affairs of Sweden 
On 24 September 2018, the followers of Li Yi Bar organized a flood team again, in order to flood the Facebook pages of the Swedish Ministry for Foreign Affairs, the Facebook pages of Swedish televisions, and the Facebook pages of Jesper Rönndahl. Those spammers sent myriads of comments and swear words on those Facebook pages. There were more than ten thousand comments on Jesper Rönndahl's Facebook pages, and most of them were deleted after a period of time.

Counteractions to 2019 Hong Kong protests
On 21 July 2019, to join forces with the Hong Kong government and the police force in the anti-extradition bill protest, the followers claimed that a flood will be initiated on 23 July 2019 at 20:00. Their targets could include Facebook or LIHKG. However, the operation started in advance on 22 July 2019, and Facebook pages of Civil Human Rights Front and Hong Kong National Front are flooded. Very soon, some core members were doxed. On the same day, an admin of Li Yi Bar called off the operation "to prevent disturbing the normality of life of Hong Kong citizens."

Restrictions of posts 
Because myriads of followers exist in Li Yi Bar and even some bot accounts send pornographic posts, now many posts require CAPTCHAs.

See also 
 Chinese nationalism

References 

Cyberattacks
Internet activism
Pages with unreviewed translations
Internet trolling
Baidu Tieba